Megalodon is an extinct genus of bivalve molluscs that reportedly lived from the Devonian to the Jurassic period. It is not clear, however, that all the fossils assigned to Megalodon from that span of time really belong in the same genus. Jurassic relatives of Megalodon such as Pachyrisma grande were closely related to the rudists.

Species 
†Megalodon hungaricum
†Megalodon longjiangensis
†Megalodon rostratiforme
†Megalodon yanceyi
†Megalodon abbreviatus

Distribution 
Fossils of the bivalve Megalodon have been found in:
Devonian
 Austria, Canada (Alberta), Germany, and Italy
Permian
 China and Malaysia
Triassic
 Bulgaria, Colombia, Hungary, Italy, Serbia and Montenegro and the United Arab Emirates
Jurassic
 Italy and Morocco

References 

Prehistoric bivalve genera
Molluscs of Africa
Mesozoic Africa
Bivalves of Asia
Paleozoic Asia
Bivalves of Europe
Paleozoic Europe
Mesozoic Europe
Prehistoric bivalves of North America
Devonian Canada
Molluscs of South America
Triassic Colombia
Fossil taxa described in 1827
Bivalve taxonomy
Fossils of Serbia